Interstate is a digital typeface designed by Tobias Frere-Jones in the period 1993–1999, and licensed by Font Bureau. The typeface is based on Style Type E of the FHWA series of fonts, a signage alphabet drawn for the United States Federal Highway Administration by Dr. Theodore W. Forbes in 1949.

Frere-Jones' Interstate typeface, while optimal for signage, has refinements making it suitable for text setting in print and on-screen, and gained popularity as such in the 1990s. Due to its wide spacing, it is best suited for display usage in print. Frere-Jones later designed another signage typeface, Whitney, published by Hoefler & Co., that bears a resemblance to its ancestor while being less flamboyant and more economical for general print usage, in body copy, or in headlines.

The terminals of ascending and descending strokes are cut at an angle to the stroke (see lowercase t and l), and on curved strokes (see lowercase e and s), terminals are drawn at a 90° angle to the stroke, positioning them at an angle to the baseline. Counters are open, even in the bold and bold condensed weights, further contributing to legibility. Punctuation is based on a rectangular shape, while official FHWA punctuation is based on a circular shape.

Greece-based Parachute Type Foundry designed the PF Grand Gothik Variable typeface, based on the Interstate typeface, with OpenType features.

Parachute Type Foundry also designed the PF Highway Sans typeface, which also based on the Interstate typeface.

Usage of the typeface 

The font is used by a number of large organizations in their logotype and branding materials. Notable examples include Citigroup (Citibank), Children's Television Workshop, and Sainsbury's supermarkets, as well as recent signage for Southwest Airlines, Invesco, UK rail company c2c, Ealing / Hammersmith / West London College, Trinity College, Lamborghini, Cognizant, SoundCloud and CISV. It is also used for the logo of the Spanish socialdemocratic party PSOE.

In 2004, the Weather Channel started using the fonts on-air and on IntelliStar systems. It was added to TWC's WeatherSTAR XL in a graphical update in 2005. It was mainly retired in 2008, for Helvetica Neue and Akzidenz-Grotesk; however, the font continued to be used on IntelliStar systems until November 2013, as part of a rebranding.

In November 2006, the U.S. Army launched its Army Strong ad campaign, utilizing Interstate as its primary typeface for all ad material.

In May 2008, Ernst & Young adopted the use of Interstate in marketing materials and reports as part of a new global visual identity.

The 2010 video game GoldenEye 007 uses Interstate Light Condensed for all in-game text.

The typeface is used on the Global Television Network for its on-air newscasts and general branding.

The current Sesame Street sign/logo uses this font in Compressed Bold.
Radio times and the Daily Mirror newspaper use the font in their tv guide and headlines.
Virgin Media 360 use it on their interface.

See also 

 Overpass, an open source replacement commissioned by Red Hat

References

Sources

External links
http://store.typenetwork.com/fonts/?sort=name&name=interstate
US Army Army Strong Style Guide

Font Bureau typefaces
Sans-serif typefaces
Digital typefaces
Display typefaces
Typefaces designed by Tobias Frere-Jones